Bumetopia yagii is a species of beetle in the family Cerambycidae. It was described by Masao Hayashi in 1994.

References

Homonoeini
Beetles described in 1994